Dvinskoy is the name of several rural localities in Russia:
Dvinskoy, Verkhnetoyemsky District, Arkhangelsk Oblast, a settlement in Dvinskoye Rural Settlement of Verkhnetoyemsky District, Arkhangelsk Oblast
Dvinskoy, Kholmogorsky District, Arkhangelsk Oblast, a settlement in Dvinskoye Rural Settlement of Kholmogorsky District, Arkhangelsk Oblast